Perumal Rasu. R (Tamil: இரா. பெருமாள் ராசு; born on 19 November 1931) is an Indian poet and a writer from Krishnagiri, Krishnagiri District, Tamil Nadu.

Perumal Rasu is also a painter, martial artist, and Spiritual master. His followers consider him a great soul (Sanskrit: Mahatma) and address him as Karumalai Siddhar (Tamil: கருமலை சித்தர், English: Saint of Krishnagiri). He is a devotee of Yogi Ramsuratkumar, popularly known as "Visiri samiyar" (Tamil: விசிறி சாமியார் ).

Notable works 
 Pranava Pravagam (Tamil: பிரணவப் பிரவாகம்)
 Prapanja Kavidhaigal (Tamil: பிரபஞ்சக் கவிதைகள்)
 Aanandha Paravasam (Tamil: ஆனந்த பரவசம்)
 Gnana Thooral (Tamil: ஞானத் தூறல்)
 Vidiyalai Thaedi (Tamil: விடியலைத் தேடி)
 Koodal Sangamam (Tamil: கூடல் சங்கமம்)
 Unnai Thaedu (Tamil: உன்னைத் தேடு)
 Idho oru idhigaasam (Tamil: இதோ ஒரு இதிகாசம்)

His Maathiyosi (Tamil: மாத்தியோசி) was serialized in a popular regional weekly, Ananda Vikatan and won accolades. Owing to its huge popularity, the series was released as a book.

References

External links
 'Sri Perumal Raju'
 'Amarakavyam...'
 'Facebook Profile'
 'Google+ Profile and Books'
 'Waves of Love... Page 133-135'
 
 
 
 
 
 'Kavignar Perumal Rasu- Pranava Pravagam - Vamanan Blog'

1931 births
Living people
People from Tamil Nadu by district
Tamil poets
Indian male poets
Tamil writers
20th-century Indian poets
Poets from Tamil Nadu
20th-century Indian male writers